Space Age 2.0 is a compilation album by DJ Tiësto and DJ Montana. It is the second release in the Space Age series.

Track listing

References

Tiësto compilation albums
1998 compilation albums
Black Hole Recordings albums